Forward Operating Base Bostick (FOB Bostick), previously called FOB Naray, was a U.S. military outpost in the Kunar Province of Afghanistan. In July 2008, the name of the base was changed in memory of Major Thomas G. Bostick Jr. of Llano, Texas, who was killed in action.

Deployed units
Units deployed to FOB Bostick have included:
367th Engineer Battalion Detachment (2005)
Alpha Battery, 1st Battalion, 188th Air Defence Artillery (ND ARNG) (2006-2007)
3rd Squadron, 71st Cavalry Regiment (RSTA)(2006-2007)
1st Squadron, 91st Cavalry Regiment (2007)
 Headquarters and Headquarters Troop
4th Battalion, 25th Field Artillery Regiment (2006-2007) 
 Embedded Training Team 7-2
6th Squadron, 4th Cavalry Regiment (2008-2009)
3rd Battalion, 321st Field Artillery Regiment (2008-2009)
Charlie Battery, 1st Battalion, 321st Field Artillery Regiment (Airborne) (2009-2010)
Bravo Battery, 3rd Battalion, 321st Field Artillery Regiment (2010)
2nd Platoon, 984th Military Police Company (2009-2010)
3rd Squadron, 61st Cavalry Regiment (2009-2010)
1st Squadron, 32nd Cavalry Regiment (2010-2011)
 Charlie Troop
 Delta Troop
1st Battalion, 377th Field Artillery Regiment (2011-2012)
2nd Battalion, 27th Infantry Regiment ( - March 2012)
 Battalion Headquarters
1st Battalion, 12th Infantry Regiment (March 2012 - )
 Headquarters and Headquarters Company
 Charlie Company
91st Cavalry Regiment

 Aviation
C Company, 563rd Aviation Support Battalion (2008-2009)
Elements of 10th Combat Aviation Brigade (2010-2011)
Elements of 101st Combat Aviation Brigade  (2012-2013)
Elements of 82nd Combat Aviation Brigade
 122nd Aviation Support Battalion (2007)
Elements of 10th Combat Aviation Brigade

See also

List of forward operating bases
List of NATO installations in Afghanistan

References

Military installations of the United States in Afghanistan
Kunar Province